In quantum mechanics, a sum rule is a formula for transitions between energy levels, in which the sum of the transition strengths is expressed in a simple form. Sum rules are used to describe the properties of many physical systems, including solids, atoms, atomic nuclei, and nuclear constituents such as protons and neutrons.

The sum rules are derived from general principles, and are useful in situations where the behavior of individual energy levels is too complex to be described by a precise quantum-mechanical theory. In general, sum rules are derived by using Heisenberg's quantum-mechanical algebra to construct operator equalities, which are then applied to the particles or energy levels of a system.

Derivation of sum rules
Assume that the Hamiltonian  has a complete
set of eigenfunctions  with eigenvalues
:

For the Hermitian operator  we define the
repeated commutator  iteratively by:

The operator  is Hermitian since 
is defined to be Hermitian. The operator  is
anti-Hermitian:

By induction one finds:

and also

For a Hermitian operator we have

Using this relation we derive:

The result can be written as

For  this gives:

See also

 Oscillator strength
 Sum rules (quantum field theory)
 QCD sum rules

References

Quantum mechanics